Serge-Thomas Bonino (born 3 November 1961) is a French Catholic theologian and religious of the Dominican Order. He became the secretary of the International Theological Commission in 2011 and was appointed Professor of Philosophy at the Pontifical University of Saint Thomas Aquinas in Rome in 2014.

References

External links

 
 

1961 births
Living people
20th-century French Catholic theologians
French Dominicans
International Theological Commission
Academic staff of the Pontifical University of Saint Thomas Aquinas